Synaphea whicherensis is a shrub endemic to Western Australia.

It is found on flats and winter wet depressions in the South West region of Western Australia between Capel and Augusta where it grows in gravelly-sandy soils over laterite.

References

Eudicots of Western Australia
whicherensis
Endemic flora of Western Australia
Plants described in 1995